Damas Gratis (Spanish for "Ladies' Night", literally "Ladies for Free") is an Argentine cumbia villera band started by Pablo Lescano in 2000.

In 2012, their album Esquivando el éxito won a Premios Gardel award for the best album by a "tropical" group.

Discography
 Para los Pibes del Pabellón 2(2000)
 En Vivo - Hasta las Manos (2001)
 Operación Damas Gratis (2002)
 100% Negro Cumbiero (2004)
 Damas gratis - En Vivo 2004 (2004)
 Sin Remedio (2005)
 Solo para Entendidos (2006)
 La Gota que Rebasó El Vaso (2008)

References

External links
 Official site (Spanish)

Argentine musical groups
Cumbia musical groups
Musical groups established in 2000